The 1986 Toronto Blue Jays season was the franchise's tenth season of Major League Baseball. It resulted in the Blue Jays finishing fourth in the American League East with a record of 86 wins and 76 losses.

Offseason
 January 3, 1986: Luis Sojo was signed as an amateur free agent by the Blue Jays.
 January 14, 1986: Mark Whiten was drafted by the Blue Jays in the 5th round of the 1986 Major League Baseball draft. Player signed April 28, 1986.
 March 14, 1986: César Cedeño was signed as a free agent by the Blue Jays.

Regular season
Tony Fernández and Jesse Barfield had career years with the Blue Jays. Fernandez led the American League with 683 at bats, and he was the first Blue Jay to get over 200 hits in a season with 213. Barfield led the American League with 40 home runs.

Mark Eichhorn also had a breakout year with the Blue Jays. He was second on the team with 10 saves, and he led the team in ERA with 1.72 and strikeouts with 166. He tied with Jim Clancy and Jimmy Key for the team lead in wins with 14.

 May 17, 1986: Jesse Barfield had six RBIs in one game against the Cleveland Indians.

Season standings

Record vs. opponents

Transactions
 April 3, 1986: César Cedeño was released by the Blue Jays.
 April 8, 1986: Joe Beckwith was signed as a free agent by the Blue Jays.
 July 6, 1986: Doyle Alexander was traded by the Blue Jays to the Atlanta Braves for Duane Ward.
 July 31, 1986: Joe Beckwith was purchased from the Blue Jays by the Los Angeles Dodgers.

Draft picks
 June 2, 1986: Doug Linton was drafted by the Blue Jays in the 43rd round of the 1986 Major League Baseball draft. Player signed September 5, 1986.

Roster

Game log

|- align="center" bgcolor="ffbbbb"
| 1 || April 8 || @ Rangers || 6 – 3 || Guzmán (1-0) || Stieb (0-1) || Harris (1) || 40,602 || 0-1
|- align="center" bgcolor="bbffbb"
| 2 || April 9 || @ Rangers || 3 – 1 || Alexander (1-0) || Correa (0-1) || Henke (1) || 8,589 || 1-1
|- align="center" bgcolor="bbffbb"
| 3 || April 10 || @ Rangers || 11 – 10 || Henke (1-0) || Harris (0-1) || || 8,341 || 2-1
|- align="center" bgcolor="bbffbb"
| 4 || April 11 || @ Royals || 6 – 2 || Clancy (1-0) || Gubicza (0-1) || || 39,033 || 3-1
|- align="center" bgcolor="ffbbbb"
| 5 || April 12 || @ Royals || 1 – 0 || Leonard (1-0) || Acker (0-1) || || 24,332 || 3-2
|- align="center" bgcolor="ffbbbb"
| 6 || April 13 || @ Royals || 7 – 4 || Black (1-1) || Stieb (0-2) || Farr (1) || 26,684 || 3-3
|- align="center" bgcolor="ffbbbb"
| 7 || April 14 || Orioles || 2 – 1 || Boddicker (1-0) || Alexander (1-1) || || 43,587 || 3-4
|- align="center" bgcolor="bbbbbb"
| -- || April 16 || Orioles || colspan=6|Postponed (rain) Rescheduled for April 17
|- align="center" bgcolor="ffbbbb"
| 8 || April 17 || Orioles || 5 – 3 || Flanagan (1-1) || Key (0-1) || Aase (2) || || 3-5
|- align="center" bgcolor="bbffbb"
| 9 || April 17 || Orioles || 7 – 4 || Henke (2-0) || Martinez (0-1) || || 19,251 || 4-5
|- align="center" bgcolor="ffbbbb"
| 10 || April 18 || Royals || 6 – 4 || Leonard (2-0) || Stieb (0-3) || Quisenberry (2) || 21,224 || 4-6
|- align="center" bgcolor="bbffbb"
| 11 || April 19 || Royals || 6 – 5 || Alexander (2-1) || Black (1-2) || Henke (2) || 26,149 || 5-6
|- align="center" bgcolor="ffbbbb"
| 12 || April 20 || Royals || 6 – 4 || Leibrandt (2-0) || Lamp (0-1) || Quisenberry (3) || 38,141 || 5-7
|- align="center" bgcolor="bbffbb"
| 13 || April 21 || Rangers || 7 – 6 || Eichhorn (1-0) || Harris (2-2) || Henke (3) || 16,219 || 6-7
|- align="center" bgcolor="ffbbbb"
| 14 || April 22 || Rangers || 10 – 1 || Witt (1-0) || Clancy (1-1) || Mahler (1) || 16,161 || 6-8
|- align="center" bgcolor="ffbbbb"
| 15 || April 23 || Rangers || 9 – 8 || Williams (1-0) || Lamp (0-2) || Harris (2) || 17,281 || 6-9
|- align="center" bgcolor="bbffbb"
| 16 || April 25 || @ Orioles || 2 – 1 (10) || Eichhorn (2-0) || Aase (1-2) || || 20,524 || 7-9
|- align="center" bgcolor="ffbbbb"
| 17 || April 26 || @ Orioles || 11 – 5 || Havens (1-1) || Henke (2-1) || || 22,659 || 7-10
|- align="center" bgcolor="bbffbb"
| 18 || April 27 || @ Orioles || 8 – 0 || Clancy (2-1) || Dixon (2-1) || || 29,928 || 8-10
|- align="center" bgcolor="ffbbbb"
| 19 || April 29 || Angels || 4 – 3 || Forster (2-0) || Eichhorn (2-1) || Moore (5) || 18,103 || 8-11
|- align="center" bgcolor="bbffbb"
| 20 || April 30 || Angels || 6 – 4 || Alexander (3-1) || Moore (1-1) || || 18,171 || 9-11
|-

|- align="center" bgcolor="ffbbbb"
| 21 || May 1 || Angels || 7 – 4 || Slaton (3-1) || Key (0-2) || Moore (6) || 20,102 || 9-12
|- align="center" bgcolor="ffbbbb"
| 22 || May 2 || Mariners || 3 – 2 (11) || Ladd (2-1) || Eichhorn (2-2) || || 18,134 || 9-13
|- align="center" bgcolor="ffbbbb"
| 23 || May 3 || Mariners || 4 – 2 || Morgan (2-2) || Acker (0-2) || Ladd (1) || 27,115 || 9-14
|- align="center" bgcolor="bbffbb"
| 24 || May 4 || Mariners || 3 – 2 || Henke (3-1) || Moore (1-3) || || 22,154 || 10-14
|- align="center" bgcolor="bbffbb"
| 25 || May 5 || Athletics || 10 – 6 || Eichhorn (3-2) || Krueger (0-1) || || 20,111 || 11-14
|- align="center" bgcolor="ffbbbb"
| 26 || May 6 || Athletics || 17 – 3 || Haas (6-0) || Key (0-3) || || 22,177 || 11-15
|- align="center" bgcolor="ffbbbb"
| 27 || May 7 || @ Angels || 6 – 2 || Sutton (1-3) || Clancy (2-2) || Corbett (2) || 24,895 || 11-16
|- align="center" bgcolor="bbffbb"
| 28 || May 8 || @ Angels || 7 – 6 || Eichhorn (4-2) || Forster (3-1) || Henke (4) || 23,650 || 12-16
|- align="center" bgcolor="ffbbbb"
| 29 || May 9 || @ Mariners || 13 – 3 || Moore (2-3) || Stieb (0-4) || || 12,026 || 12-17
|- align="center" bgcolor="ffbbbb"
| 30 || May 10 || @ Mariners || 8 – 7 (11) || Ladd (3-1) || Henke (3-2) || || 20,155 || 12-18
|- align="center" bgcolor="bbffbb"
| 31 || May 11 || @ Mariners || 4 – 3 || Key (1-3) || Swift (0-3) || Eichhorn (1) || 10,172 || 13-18
|- align="center" bgcolor="bbffbb"
| 32 || May 12 || @ Athletics || 5 – 3 || Clancy (3-2) || Andújar (4-2) || Eichhorn (2) || 20,126 || 14-18
|- align="center" bgcolor="ffbbbb"
| 33 || May 13 || @ Athletics || 6 – 3 (10) || Mooneyham (1-0) || Lamp (0-3) || || 7,124 || 14-19
|- align="center" bgcolor="ffbbbb"
| 34 || May 14 || @ Athletics || 9 – 4 || Young (1-0) || Stieb (0-5) || || 10,940 || 14-20
|- align="center" bgcolor="bbffbb"
| 35 || May 16 || Indians || 7 – 6 || Acker (1-2) || Candiotti (2-4) || Eichhorn (3) || 21,251 || 15-20
|- align="center" bgcolor="bbffbb"
| 36 || May 17 || Indians || 11 – 5 || Key (2-3) || Heaton (1-3) || || 27,473 || 16-20
|- align="center" bgcolor="bbffbb"
| 37 || May 18 || Indians || 10 – 2 || Clancy (4-2) || Schulze (2-1) || || 28,063 || 17-20
|- align="center" bgcolor="ffbbbb"
| 38 || May 19 || Indians || 6 – 4 || Niekro (3-3) || Stieb (0-6) || Bailes (3) || 27,202 || 17-21
|- align="center" bgcolor="ffbbbb"
| 39 || May 20 || @ White Sox || 2 – 1 || Davis (2-1) || Cerutti (0-1) || || 12,837 || 17-22
|- align="center" bgcolor="ffbbbb"
| 40 || May 21 || @ White Sox || 5 – 4 || Nelson (4-1) || Acker (1-3) || || 13,976 || 17-23
|- align="center" bgcolor="bbffbb"
| 41 || May 22 || @ White Sox || 5 – 0 || Key (3-3) || Dotson (2-4) || || 12,605 || 18-23
|- align="center" bgcolor="ffbbbb"
| 42 || May 23 || @ Indians || 3 – 1 || Schulze (3-1) || Clancy (4-3) || || 61,340 || 18-24
|- align="center" bgcolor="bbffbb"
| 43 || May 24 || @ Indians || 9 – 6 || Lamp (1-3) || Easterly (0-2) || Eichhorn (4) || 12,348 || 19-24
|- align="center" bgcolor="bbffbb"
| 44 || May 25 || @ Indians || 8 – 1 || Cerutti (1-1) || Schrom (3-2) || || 13,772 || 20-24
|- align="center" bgcolor="ffbbbb"
| 45 || May 26 || @ Twins || 9 – 1 || Portugal (1-5) || Alexander (3-2) || || 10,885 || 20-25
|- align="center" bgcolor="ffbbbb"
| 46 || May 27 || @ Twins || 7 – 6 (11) || Pastore (2-0) || Henke (3-3) || || 9,052 || 20-26
|- align="center" bgcolor="bbffbb"
| 47 || May 28 || @ Twins || 14 – 8 || Clancy (5-3) || Blyleven (4-4) || || 9,133 || 21-26
|- align="center" bgcolor="bbffbb"
| 48 || May 30 || White Sox || 6 – 0 || Stieb (1-6) || Davis (2-2) || || 31,125 || 22-26
|- align="center" bgcolor="bbffbb"
| 49 || May 31 || White Sox || 4 – 3 (11) || Henke (4-3) || Nelson (4-2) || || 40,145 || 23-26
|-

|- align="center" bgcolor="ffbbbb"
| 50 || June 1 || White Sox || 6 – 4 || Dotson (3-5) || Key (3-4) || || 31,302 || 23-27
|- align="center" bgcolor="bbffbb"
| 51 || June 2 || Twins || 3 – 1 || Clancy (6-3) || Blyleven (4-5) || Henke (5) || 26,022 || 24-27
|- align="center" bgcolor="bbffbb"
| 52 || June 3 || Twins || 6 – 5 || Eichhorn (5-2) || Atherton (2-3) || Henke (6) || 27,112 || 25-27
|- align="center" bgcolor="ffbbbb"
| 53 || June 4 || Twins || 10 – 4 || Viola (5-5) || Stieb (1-7) || || 30,234 || 25-28
|- align="center" bgcolor="bbffbb"
| 54 || June 6 || @ Tigers || 12 – 2 || Alexander (4-2) || Terrell (6-3) || || 37,353 || 26-28
|- align="center" bgcolor="ffbbbb"
| 55 || June 7 || @ Tigers || 2 – 1 || Tanana (5-4) || Key (3-5) || Hernández (9) || 37,750 || 26-29
|- align="center" bgcolor="bbffbb"
| 56 || June 8 || @ Tigers || 4 – 2 || Eichhorn (6-2) || O'Neal (0-3) || Henke (7) || 36,681 || 27-29
|- align="center" bgcolor="bbffbb"
| 57 || June 9 || Red Sox || 5 – 1 || Stieb (2-7) || Woodward (1-2) || || 27,551 || 28-29
|- align="center" bgcolor="ffbbbb"
| 58 || June 10 || Red Sox || 4 – 3 (10) || Stanley (3-2) || Eichhorn (6-3) || || 28,149 || 28-30
|- align="center" bgcolor="ffbbbb"
| 59 || June 11 || Red Sox || 3 – 2 || Clemens (11-0) || Alexander (4-3) || Stanley (10) || 25,226 || 28-31
|- align="center" bgcolor="bbffbb"
| 60 || June 12 || Tigers || 9 – 0 (7) || Key (4-5) || LaPoint (2-5) || || 30,135 || 29-31
|- align="center" bgcolor="ffbbbb"
| 61 || June 13 || Tigers || 10 – 5 || King (2-0) || Clancy (6-4) || || 36,471 || 29-32
|- align="center" bgcolor="bbffbb"
| 62 || June 14 || Tigers || 6 – 5 || Henke (5-3) || Hernández (2-3) || || 40,063 || 30-32
|- align="center" bgcolor="bbffbb"
| 63 || June 15 || Tigers || 9 – 6 || Lamp (2-3) || Cary (0-2) || Henke (8) || 38,157 || 31-32
|- align="center" bgcolor="bbffbb"
| 64 || June 16 || @ Brewers || 9 – 2 || Alexander (5-3) || Wegman (2-6) || Gordon (1) || 12,809 || 32-32
|- align="center" bgcolor="bbffbb"
| 65 || June 17 || @ Brewers || 2 – 1 (12) || Henke (6-3) || Plesac (4-4) || || 14,465 || 33-32
|- align="center" bgcolor="ffbbbb"
| 66 || June 18 || @ Brewers || 3 – 1 || Higuera (9-5) || Clancy (6-5) || || 21,652 || 33-33
|- align="center" bgcolor="bbffbb"
| 67 || June 19 || Yankees || 10 – 9 (10) || Caudill (1-0) || Righetti (4-4) || || 35,389 || 34-33
|- align="center" bgcolor="ffbbbb"
| 68 || June 20 || Yankees || 10 – 8 (10) || Fisher (3-3) || Gordon (0-1) || || 38,109 || 34-34
|- align="center" bgcolor="ffbbbb"
| 69 || June 21 || Yankees || 4 – 2 (10) || Righetti (5-4) || Lamp (2-4) || Pulido (1) || 43,678 || 34-35
|- align="center" bgcolor="bbffbb"
| 70 || June 22 || Yankees || 15 – 1 || Key (5-5) || Niekro (7-5) || || 40,101 || 35-35
|- align="center" bgcolor="ffbbbb"
| 71 || June 23 || Brewers || 5 – 3 || Darwin (4-3) || Stieb (2-8) || Plesac (6) || 26,110 || 35-36
|- align="center" bgcolor="bbffbb"
| 72 || June 24 || Brewers || 8 – 0 || Cerutti (2-1) || Higuera (9-6) || || 26,280 || 36-36
|- align="center" bgcolor="bbffbb"
| 73 || June 25 || Brewers || 5 – 1 || Clancy (7-5) || Leary (6-6) || Lamp (1) || 30,181 || 37-36
|- align="center" bgcolor="bbffbb"
| 74 || June 27 || @ Yankees || 14 – 7 || Acker (2-3) || Fisher (4-4) || Henke (9) || 30,815 || 38-36
|- align="center" bgcolor="bbffbb"
| 75 || June 28 || @ Yankees || 7 – 4 || Key (6-5) || Niekro (7-6) || || 43,187 || 39-36
|- align="center" bgcolor="bbffbb"
| 76 || June 29 || @ Yankees || 6 – 3 || Cerutti (3-1) || Fisher (4-5) || Henke (10) || 35,437 || 40-36
|- align="center" bgcolor="ffbbbb"
| 77 || June 30 || @ Red Sox || 10 – 9 (10) || Stanley (5-2) || Acker (2-4) || || 30,770 || 40-37
|-

|- align="center" bgcolor="ffbbbb"
| 78 || July 1 || @ Red Sox || 9 – 7 || Seaver (3-6) || Alexander (5-4) || Sambito (7) || 32,729 || 40-38
|- align="center" bgcolor="bbffbb"
| 79 || July 2 || @ Red Sox || 4 – 2 || Key (7-5) || Clemens (14-1) || Henke (11) || 27,493 || 41-38
|- align="center" bgcolor="bbffbb"
| 80 || July 3 || @ Red Sox || 8 – 5 || Cerutti (4-1) || Boyd (10-6) || Henke (12) || 21,123 || 42-38
|- align="center" bgcolor="ffbbbb"
| 81 || July 4 || Angels || 9 – 1 || Sutton (7-5) || Stieb (2-9) || || 30,283 || 42-39
|- align="center" bgcolor="bbffbb"
| 82 || July 5 || Angels || 7 – 3 || Clancy (8-5) || Romanick (5-7) || || 40,426 || 43-39
|- align="center" bgcolor="ffbbbb"
| 83 || July 6 || Angels || 8 – 2 || McCaskill (9-5) || Lamp (2-5) || || 36,197 || 43-40
|- align="center" bgcolor="bbffbb"
| 84 || July 7 || Mariners || 7 – 5 || Key (8-5) || Morgan (6-8) || Caudill (1) || 26,208 || 44-40
|- align="center" bgcolor="ffbbbb"
| 85 || July 8 || Mariners || 8 – 5 || Huismann (2-2) || Cerutti (4-2) || Young (8) || 28,241 || 44-41
|- align="center" bgcolor="bbffbb"
| 86 || July 9 || Mariners || 6 – 5 || Caudill (2-0) || Moore (5-8) || Henke (13) || 30,044 || 45-41
|- align="center" bgcolor="bbffbb"
| 87 || July 10 || Athletics || 8 – 4 || Clancy (9-5) || Plunk (2-5) || || 28,172 || 46-41
|- align="center" bgcolor="bbffbb"
| 88 || July 11 || Athletics || 6 – 5 || Eichhorn (7-3) || Rijo (3-8) || Henke (14) || 30,370 || 47-41
|- align="center" bgcolor="ffbbbb"
| 89 || July 12 || Athletics || 5 – 3 || Stewart (2-0) || Key (8-6) || Ontiveros (8) || 35,470 || 47-42
|- align="center" bgcolor="ffbbbb"
| 90 || July 13 || Athletics || 10 – 5 || Young (6-6) || Caudill (2-1) || Leiper (1) || 37,138 || 47-43
|- align="center" bgcolor="bbffbb"
| 91 || July 17 || @ Angels || 8 – 5 || Key (9-6) || Sutton (8-6) || Cerutti (1) || 31,585 || 48-43
|- align="center" bgcolor="bbffbb"
| 92 || July 18 || @ Angels || 2 – 0 || Clancy (10-5) || McCaskill (10-6) || Eichhorn (5) || 31,672 || 49-43
|- align="center" bgcolor="ffbbbb"
| 93 || July 19 || @ Angels || 9 – 3 || Candelaria (3-0) || Stieb (2-10) || || 30,577 || 49-44
|- align="center" bgcolor="bbffbb"
| 94 || July 20 || @ Angels || 6 – 3 (10) || Henke (7-3) || Corbett (2-2) || Caudill (2) || 27,795 || 50-44
|- align="center" bgcolor="bbffbb"
| 95 || July 21 || @ Mariners || 8 – 3 || Cerutti (5-2) || Huismann (2-3) || || 17,823 || 51-44
|- align="center" bgcolor="ffbbbb"
| 96 || July 22 || @ Mariners || 8 – 7 (12) || Reed (3-0) || Caudill (2-2) || || 10,152 || 51-45
|- align="center" bgcolor="bbffbb"
| 97 || July 23 || @ Mariners || 6 – 2 || Clancy (11-5) || Moore (6-10) || Stieb (1) || 11,485 || 52-45
|- align="center" bgcolor="ffbbbb"
| 98 || July 25 || @ Athletics || 6 – 5 (10) || Bair (1-2) || Caudill (2-3) || || 12,778 || 52-46
|- align="center" bgcolor="ffbbbb"
| 99 || July 26 || @ Athletics || 2 – 0 || Plunk (3-6) || Cerutti (5-3) || Andújar (1) || 22,168 || 52-47
|- align="center" bgcolor="ffbbbb"
| 100 || July 27 || @ Athletics || 1 – 0 (15) || Leiper (1-1) || Clarke (0-1) || || 21,628 || 52-48
|- align="center" bgcolor="bbffbb"
| 101 || July 28 || @ Royals || 6 – 0 || Clancy (12-5) || Leibrandt (9-7) || || 40,468 || 53-48
|- align="center" bgcolor="bbffbb"
| 102 || July 29 || @ Royals || 5 – 2 || Stieb (3-10) || Bankhead (4-5) || Henke (15) || 27,292 || 54-48
|- align="center" bgcolor="bbffbb"
| 103 || July 30 || @ Royals || 7 – 2 || Johnson (1-0) || Leonard (6-10) || || 35,750 || 55-48
|-

|- align="center" bgcolor="ffbbbb"
| 104 || August 1 || Orioles || 7 – 3 || Dixon (10-8) || Key (9-7) || || 34,370 || 55-49
|- align="center" bgcolor="ffbbbb"
| 105 || August 2 || Orioles || 5 – 2 || McGregor (8-10) || Clancy (12-6) || Aase (28) || 41,091 || 55-50
|- align="center" bgcolor="bbffbb"
| 106 || August 3 || Orioles || 6 – 4 || Cerutti (6-3) || Flanagan (5-7) || Henke (16) || 36,446 || 56-50
|- align="center" bgcolor="ffbbbb"
| 107 || August 4 || Orioles || 12 – 2 || Boddicker (14-5) || Johnson (1-1) || || 35,041 || 56-51
|- align="center" bgcolor="ffbbbb"
| 108 || August 5 || Royals || 8 – 6 || Bankhead (5-5) || Lamp (2-6) || Farr (6) || 30,437 || 56-52
|- align="center" bgcolor="bbffbb"
| 109 || August 6 || Royals || 8 – 0 || Key (10-7) || Jackson (6-8) || || 32,130 || 57-52
|- align="center" bgcolor="bbffbb"
| 110 || August 7 || Royals || 5 – 4 || Eichhorn (8-3) || Farr (7-3) || Henke (17) || 34,285 || 58-52
|- align="center" bgcolor="ffbbbb"
| 111 || August 8 || @ Rangers || 9 – 7 || Harris (6-8) || Eichhorn (8-4) || || 31,197 || 58-53
|- align="center" bgcolor="ffbbbb"
| 112 || August 9 || @ Rangers || 7 – 6 (10) || Harris (7-8) || Caudill (2-4) || || 31,517 || 58-54
|- align="center" bgcolor="bbffbb"
| 113 || August 10 || @ Rangers || 8 – 7 (10) || Eichhorn (9-3) || Williams (8-4) || || 15,040 || 59-54
|- align="center" bgcolor="ffbbbb"
| 114 || August 11 || @ Orioles || 3 – 1 || Flanagan (6-7) || Key (10-8) || Aase (29) || 21,444 || 59-55
|- align="center" bgcolor="bbffbb"
| 115 || August 12 || @ Orioles || 3 – 0 || Clancy (13-6) || McGregor (8-11) || || 20,292 || 60-55
|- align="center" bgcolor="ffbbbb"
| 116 || August 13 || @ Orioles || 7 – 6 (13) || Aase (5-3) || Aquino (0-1) || || 22,477 || 60-56
|- align="center" bgcolor="bbffbb"
| 117 || August 15 || Rangers || 6 – 1 || Johnson (2-1) || Correa (7-10) || Eichhorn (6) || 31,411 || 61-56
|- align="center" bgcolor="bbffbb"
| 118 || August 16 || Rangers || 13 – 1 || Key (11-8) || Hough (9-8) || || 41,203 || 62-56
|- align="center" bgcolor="bbffbb"
| 119 || August 17 || Rangers || 8 – 7 (11) || Eichhorn (10-4) || Russell (4-2) || || 38,413 || 63-56
|- align="center" bgcolor="bbffbb"
| 120 || August 19 || White Sox || 5 – 1 || Stieb (4-10) || Cowley (8-8) || || 34,158 || 64-56
|- align="center" bgcolor="bbffbb"
| 121 || August 20 || White Sox || 4 – 1 || Johnson (3-1) || DeLeón (3-2) || || 33,493 || 65-56
|- align="center" bgcolor="ffbbbb"
| 122 || August 21 || White Sox || 4 – 3 || Schmidt (1-4) || Key (11-9) || Nelson (5) || 35,393 || 65-57
|- align="center" bgcolor="ffbbbb"
| 123 || August 22 || @ Twins || 4 – 3 || Blyleven (13-10) || Clancy (13-7) || Frazier (2) || 14,359 || 65-58
|- align="center" bgcolor="bbffbb"
| 124 || August 23 || @ Twins || 7 – 4 || Cerutti (7-3) || Smithson (9-12) || Eichhorn (7) || 22,604 || 66-58
|- align="center" bgcolor="bbffbb"
| 125 || August 24 || @ Twins || 7 – 5 (10) || Henke (8-3) || Atherton (5-8) || || 18,117 || 67-58
|- align="center"
| 126 || August 26 || @ Indians || 6 – 6 (9) || colspan=3|Postponed (rain) Rescheduled for August 27 || 5,400 || 67-58
|- align="center" bgcolor="bbffbb"
| 127 || August 27 || @ Indians || 3 – 2 (12) || Eichhorn (11-4) || Oelkers (2-3) || Henke (18) || || 68-58
|- align="center" bgcolor="bbffbb"
| 128 || August 27 || @ Indians || 6 – 3 || Cerutti (8-3) || Wills (1-2) || Henke (19) || 9,051 || 69-58
|- align="center" bgcolor="bbffbb"
| 129 || August 28 || @ Indians || 9 – 1 || Clancy (14-7) || Schrom (11-6) || || 7,466 || 70-58
|- align="center" bgcolor="bbffbb"
| 130 || August 29 || Twins || 6 – 5 || Eichhorn (12-4) || Atherton (5-10) || || 38,241 || 71-58
|- align="center" bgcolor="bbffbb"
| 131 || August 30 || Twins || 8 – 1 || Johnson (4-1) || Viola (13-10) || Lamp (2) || 43,556 || 72-58
|- align="center" bgcolor="bbffbb"
| 132 || August 31 || Twins || 7 – 5 || Aquino (1-1) || Anderson (3-5) || Eichhorn (8) || 45,161 || 73-58
|-

|- align="center" bgcolor="bbffbb"
| 133 || September 1 || Indians || 5 – 4 || Henke (9-3) || Camacho (2-3) || || 44,335 || 74-58
|- align="center" bgcolor="ffbbbb"
| 134 || September 2 || Indians || 9 – 5 || Schrom (12-6) || Clancy (14-8) || Wills (2) || 33,535 || 74-59
|- align="center" bgcolor="bbffbb"
| 135 || September 3 || Indians || 3 – 1 || Stieb (5-10) || Candiotti (13-10) || Henke (20) || 31,532 || 75-59
|- align="center" bgcolor="ffbbbb"
| 136 || September 5 || @ White Sox || 5 – 0 || Dotson (10-13) || Johnson (4-2) || || 11,650 || 75-60
|- align="center" bgcolor="bbffbb"
| 137 || September 6 || @ White Sox || 4 – 0 || Key (12-9) || Bannister (9-11) || || 22,014 || 76-60
|- align="center" bgcolor="ffbbbb"
| 138 || September 7 || @ White Sox || 4 – 3 || Nelson (6-6) || Clancy (14-9) || Thigpen (5) || 13,553 || 76-61
|- align="center" bgcolor="ffbbbb"
| 139 || September 9 || Yankees || 3 – 1 || Guidry (7-10) || Eichhorn (12-5) || Righetti (36) || 35,353 || 76-62
|- align="center" bgcolor="bbbbbb"
| -- || September 10 || Yankees || colspan=6|Postponed (rain) Rescheduled for September 11
|- align="center" bgcolor="ffbbbb"
| 140 || September 11 || Yankees || 3 – 1 || Drabek (5-7) || Key (12-10) || Righetti (37) || || 76-63
|- align="center" bgcolor="ffbbbb"
| 141 || September 11 || Yankees || 7 – 5 || Fisher (9-5) || Henke (9-4) || Righetti (38) || 33,292 || 76-64
|- align="center" bgcolor="ffbbbb"
| 142 || September 12 || @ Brewers || 4 – 1 || Johnson (2-1) || Clancy (14-10) || Clear (13) || 7,255 || 76-65
|- align="center" bgcolor="bbffbb"
| 143 || September 13 || @ Brewers || 7 – 1 || Johnson (5-2) || Vuckovich (1-2) || Eichhorn (9) || 10,472 || 77-65
|- align="center" bgcolor="ffbbbb"
| 144 || September 14 || @ Brewers || 5 – 0 || Higuera (19-9) || Stieb (5-11) || || 8,706 || 77-66
|- align="center" bgcolor="bbffbb"
| 145 || September 15 || @ Brewers || 5 – 2 || Cerutti (9-3) || Wegman (4-12) || Henke (21) || 5,742 || 78-66
|- align="center" bgcolor="bbffbb"
| 146 || September 16 || Tigers || 6 – 4 || Key (13-10) || Terrell (12-12) || Henke (22) || 31,128 || 79-66
|- align="center" bgcolor="ffbbbb"
| 147 || September 17 || Tigers || 8 – 6 || Morris (18-8) || Clancy (14-11) || Hernández (22) || 30,116 || 79-67
|- align="center" bgcolor="bbffbb"
| 148 || September 19 || Red Sox || 6 – 4 || Stieb (6-11) || Seaver (7-13) || Henke (23) || 40,494 || 80-67
|- align="center" bgcolor="bbffbb"
| 149 || September 20 || Red Sox || 5 – 2 || Johnson (6-2) || Nipper (9-11) || Eichhorn (10) || 43,713 || 81-67
|- align="center" bgcolor="ffbbbb"
| 150 || September 21 || Red Sox || 3 – 2 || Clemens (24-4) || Key (13-11) || Schiraldi (9) || 44,197 || 81-68
|- align="center" bgcolor="ffbbbb"
| 151 || September 22 || @ Tigers || 2 – 1 || Morris (19-8) || Clancy (14-12) || || 14,979 || 81-69
|- align="center" bgcolor="bbffbb"
| 152 || September 23 || @ Tigers || 6 – 3 || Eichhorn (13-5) || Hernández (8-7) || Henke (24) || 14,364 || 82-69
|- align="center" bgcolor="bbffbb"
| 153 || September 24 || @ Tigers || 8 – 2 || Stieb (7-11) || Petry (5-9) || || 15,069 || 83-69
|- align="center" bgcolor="bbffbb"
| 154 || September 25 || @ Tigers || 4 – 2 || Johnson (7-2) || Tanana (11-9) || Henke (25) || 16,591 || 84-69
|- align="center" bgcolor="bbffbb"
| 155 || September 26 || @ Red Sox || 1 – 0 (12) || Eichhorn (14-5) || Schiraldi (4-2) || Henke (26) || 33,657 || 85-69
|- align="center" bgcolor="ffbbbb"
| 156 || September 27 || @ Red Sox || 2 – 0 || Hurst (13-7) || Clancy (14-13) || || 33,358 || 85-70
|- align="center" bgcolor="ffbbbb"
| 157 || September 28 || @ Red Sox || 12 – 3 || Boyd (16-10) || Ward (0-1) || || 32,929 || 85-71
|- align="center" bgcolor="ffbbbb"
| 158 || September 29 || @ Yankees || 8 – 1 || Rasmussen (17-6) || Cerutti (9-4) || || 15,770 || 85-72
|- align="center" bgcolor="ffbbbb"
| 159 || September 30 || @ Yankees || 5 – 2 || Nielsen (3-4) || Stieb (7-12) || Righetti (43) || 15,166 || 85-73
|-

|- align="center" bgcolor="bbffbb"
| 160 || October 1 || @ Yankees || 3 – 0 || Key (14-11) || Guidry (9-12) || Henke (27) || 17,876 || 86-73
|- align="center" bgcolor="ffbbbb"
| 161 || October 3 || Brewers || 4 – 1 || Wegman (5-12) || Clancy (14-14) || Plesac (14) || 26,619 || 86-74
|- align="center" bgcolor="bbbbbb"
| -- || October 4 || Brewers || colspan=6|Postponed (rain) Rescheduled for October 5
|- align="center" bgcolor="ffbbbb"
| 162 || October 5 || Brewers || 2 – 1 || Leary (12-12) || Henke (9-5) || Clear (15) || || 86-75
|- align="center" bgcolor="ffbbbb"
| 163 || October 5 || Brewers || 4 – 3 || Nieves (11-12) || Eichhorn (14-6) || Clear (16) || 34,176 || 86-76
|-

Player stats

Batting

Starters by position
Note: Pos = Position; G = Games played; AB = At bats; H = Hits; Avg. = Batting average; HR = Home runs; RBI = Runs batted in

Other batters
Note: G = Games played; AB = At bats; H = Hits; Avg. = Batting average; HR = Home runs; RBI = Runs batted in

Pitching

Starting pitchers
Note: G = Games pitched; IP = Innings pitched; W = Wins; L = Losses; ERA = Earned run average; SO = Strikeouts

Other pitchers
Note: G = Games pitched; IP = Innings pitched; W = Wins; L = Losses; SV = Saves; ERA = Earned run average; SO = Strikeouts

Relief pitchers
Note: G = Games pitched; IP = Innings pitched; W = Wins; L = Losses; SV = Saves; ERA = Earned run average; SO = Strikeouts

Award winners
Jesse Barfield, American League Home Run Champion, 40 Home Runs
 Jesse Barfield, Gold Glove Award
 Jesse Barfield, Silver Slugger Award
George Bell, Silver Slugger Award
Mark Eichhorn, The Sporting News Rookie of the Year Award
Tony Fernández, American League Leader in At-Bats, 687
 Tony Fernández, Gold Glove Award

All-Star Game
 Jesse Barfield, outfield
 Lloyd Moseby, outfield
 Tony Fernández, shortstop

Farm system

LEAGUE CHAMPIONS: St. Catharines

References

External links
1986 Toronto Blue Jays at Baseball Reference
1986 Toronto Blue Jays at Baseball Almanac

Toronto Blue Jays seasons
Toronto Blue Jays season
1986 in Canadian sports
1986 in Toronto